Gaitana, also known as Guaitipan, is referred to as La Gaitana and Cacica Gaitana, was a 16th-century Yalcon cacica from the region of Timaná, Huila, a leader who, in 1539–40, led the indigenous people of the Upper Magdalena River Valley in Colombia in armed resistance against the colonization by the Spanish. Her monument sculpted by Rodrigo Arenas stands in Neiva, the capital of the Huila Department in Colombia.

Pre-Columbian era 

According to Spanish chronologists, at the time of conquest, the modern territory of Huila Department was inhabited by many different indigenous peoples. The Yalcón (with nearly 6,000 warriors), the Avirama, the Pinao, the Guanaca, and the Paez lived north of the Magdalena River, with later concentrations around the La Plata River. South of the Magdalena River lived the Andaquí and Timaná and to the east lived the Pijao.

Pedro de Añasco 
Pedro de Añasco was a Spanish conquistador, sent by Sebastián de Belalcázar to found a village in the territory of what is today Timaná, in order to create a trade route through the Magdalena Valley.

De Añasco called all the indigenous leaders and demanded them to pay him a tribute. A tribe of Yalcón people, commanded by a young man and his mother (cacica Gaitana) delayed the payment, and De Añasco decided to set an example by ordering her son to be burned alive.

Revenge 
The execution of Gaitana's son caused outrage among the indigenous tribes, who decided to cooperate with each other to join forces against the Spaniards. Añasco and his men were attacked by surprise. The men were executed and Añasco had his eyes removed and was dragged around the village until he died.

Betrayal 
However, one of the indigenous leaders, Cacique Matambo, betrayed the organized indigenous forces. Matambo warned the Spaniards about plans against them with the result that the indigenous forces were crushed and the remaining indigenous people were gradually decimated by slavery, smallpox and other European diseases. A few hundred thousand of their descendants are scattered throughout the Colombian southwest as the modern Paez people, Guambiano people, and Pijao people among others.

Sources 
 Banco de la Republica: La Gaitana
 SIMÓN, Fray Pedro. Noticias historiales de las conquistas de Tierra Firme en las Indias Occidentales. Bogotá, 1953, 9 tomos.
 "A Snapshot of Colombia Occupations in Cali, the Peace Process, and Cauca by Justin Podur and Manuel Rozental 07/16/06
 "Will people power have a chance in Colombia?" by Justin Podur 07/16/06

16th-century births
16th-century deaths
Year of death missing
Colombian people of indigenous peoples descent
Colombian women
Indigenous military personnel of the Americas
Indigenous people of the Andes
Colombian rebels
Indigenous rebellions against the Spanish Empire
16th-century women rulers
Women in war in South America
Women in 16th-century warfare
Year of birth unknown
People from Huila Department